Gongronella is a genus of fungi belonging to the family Cunninghamellaceae.

The genus has cosmopolitan distribution.

Species

Species:
 Gongronella brasiliensis 
 Gongronella butleri 
 Gongronella guangdongensis

References

Fungi